is a railway station in Kita-ku, Hamamatsu,  Shizuoka Prefecture, Japan, operated by the third sector Tenryū Hamanako Railroad.

Lines
Miyakoda Station is served by the Tenryū Hamanako Line, and is located 37.7 kilometers from the starting point of the line at Kakegawa Station.

Station layout
The station has a single side platform and a single-story station building, which also contains a Good Design Award (Japan)-winning cafe. The station originally was built with opposing side platforms, but one platform was removed to create a head shunt. The station is unattended, but a public restroom facility, phone booth and Entetsu Bus Line 46 and 56 stops are located just outside. Locally-grown grapes are sold seasonally out of the farm supply center adjacent to the station.

Adjacent stations

|-
!colspan=5|Tenryū Hamanako Railroad

Station History
Miyakoda Station was established on June 1, 1940 when the section of the Japan National Railways Futamata Line was extended from Enshū-Mori Station to Kanasashi Station. Scheduled freight services were discontinued from June 1970. After the privatization of JNR on March 15, 1987, the station came under the control of the Tenryū Hamanako Line.

Passenger statistics
In fiscal 2016, the station was used by an average of 31 passengers daily (boarding passengers only).

Surrounding area
Japan National Route 362
 Entetsu Bus Toda Line 46 and Hagioka Miyakoda Line 56 stops
 DLoFre's Miyakoda Station Cafe -- Good Design Award (Japan) 2015
 Miyakoda Junior High School
 Miyakoda Elementary School
 Miyakodaminami Elementary School
 Miyakoda Municipal Library
 Miyakoda Park

See also
 List of Railway Stations in Japan

External links

  Tenryū Hamanako Railroad Station information

  Entetsu Bus information 

  DLoFre's Miyakoda Station Cafe information

  Miyakoda Municipal Library information

  Miyakoda Park information
 

Railway stations in Shizuoka Prefecture
Railway stations in Japan opened in 1940
Stations of Tenryū Hamanako Railroad
Railway stations in Hamamatsu